Andriy Vychizhanin (born 18 August 1999) is a Ukrainian professional footballer who plays as a midfielder for Polish club Zdrój Horyniec. He is also under suspended contract with Karpaty Halych.

Career
Vychizhanin is a product of the FC Lviv youth sportive school system.

He made his debut for FC Lviv as a second half-time substituted player in the losing home match against FC Mariupol on 19 July 2020 in the Ukrainian Premier League.

References

External links
Profile at UAF Official Site (Ukr)

1999 births
Living people
Sportspeople from Lviv Oblast
Association football midfielders
People from Radekhiv
Ukrainian footballers
Ukrainian Premier League players
Ukrainian First League players
NK Veres Rivne players
FC Lviv players
FC Karpaty Halych players
Ukrainian expatriate footballers
Expatriate footballers in Poland
Ukrainian expatriate sportspeople in Poland